XOTcl is an object-oriented extension for the Tool Command Language created by Gustaf Neumann and Uwe Zdun. It is a derivative of MIT OTcl. XOTcl is based on a dynamic object system with metaclasses which as influenced by CLOS. Class and method definitions are completely dynamic. XOTcl provides language support for design patterns via filters and decorator mixins.

See also
OTcl
incr Tcl
Tcl
Tcllib
C++/Tcl
Itk
Tk

References

External links
XOTcl Homepage - Extended Object Tcl 
Filters as a Language Support for Design Patterns in Object-Oriented Scripting Languages, in: Proceedings of COOTS, San Diego, California, USA, May, 1999 
Citations from CiteSeer
ActiveState's Tcl distribution for Microsoft Windows, includes XOTcl
WinTclTk open-source MinGW-based distribution for Microsoft Windows, includes XOTcl
XOTclIDE - IDE for XOTcl

Scripting languages
Dynamic programming languages
Tcl programming language family